1553 Bauersfelda, provisional designation , is a stony Koronian asteroid from the outer regions of the asteroid belt, approximately 13 kilometers in diameter. It was discovered on 13 January 1940, by astronomer Karl Reinmuth at the Heidelberg Observatory in southwest Germany. The asteroid was named after German engineer Walther Bauersfeld.

Orbit and classification 

Based on its orbital parameters, Bauersfelda is a member of the Koronis family, a very large outer asteroid family with nearly co-planar ecliptical orbits. However, Bauersfelda turns out to be a non-family asteroid from the main belt's background population when applying the hierarchical clustering method to its proper orbital elements.

Bauersfelda orbits the Sun in the outer main-belt at a distance of 2.6–3.2 AU once every 4 years and 11 months (1,810 days). Its orbit has an eccentricity of 0.10 and an inclination of 3° with respect to the ecliptic. The body's observation arc begins with its official discovery observation at Heidelberg in 1940.

Physical characteristics 

In the SMASS classification, Bauersfelda is a stony S-type asteroid. It is also characterized as a S-type by PanSTARRS photometric survey, which agrees with the Koronis family's overall spectral type.

Rotation period 

While not being a slow rotator, Bauersfeldas period is significantly longer than that of most minor planets. In August 2012, a rotational lightcurve of this asteroid was obtained from photometric observations in the R-band by astronomers at the Palomar Transient Factory in California. Lightcurve analysis gave a rotation period of 51.191 hours with a brightness variation of 0.26 magnitude.

Diameter and albedo 

According to the survey carried out by the NEOWISE mission of NASA's Wide-field Infrared Survey Explorer, Bauersfelda measures 13.772 and 14.346 kilometers in diameter and its surface has an albedo of 0.2181 and 0.249, respectively. The Collaborative Asteroid Lightcurve Link assumes an albedo of 0.24 and calculates a diameter of 11.48 kilometers based on an absolute magnitude of 11.87.

Naming 

This minor planet was named after Walther Bauersfeld (1879–1959), a German engineer who worked at the optical manufacturer Zeiss (also see 851 Zeissia, which was named after the company's founder). Bauersfeld is known as the designer of the Zeiss made planetaria such as the Planetarium Jena. The asteroid's name was announced in the mid-1950s on the occasion of his 75th anniversary. The official  was published by the Minor Planet Center in November 1953.

References

External links 
 Asteroid Lightcurve Database (LCDB), query form (info )
 Dictionary of Minor Planet Names, Google books
 Asteroids and comets rotation curves, CdR – Observatoire de Genève, Raoul Behrend
 Discovery Circumstances: Numbered Minor Planets (1)-(5000) – Minor Planet Center
 
 

001553
Discoveries by Karl Wilhelm Reinmuth
Named minor planets
001553
19400113